Pyrausta distictalis is a moth in the family Crambidae. It was described by George Hampson in 1918. It is found in Malawi.

References

Endemic fauna of Malawi
Moths described in 1918
distictalis
Moths of Africa